Chimurenga music is a Zimbabwean popular music genre coined and popularized by Thomas Mapfumo. Chimurenga is a Shona language word for liberation, which entered common usage during the Rhodesian Bush War. The word's modern interpretation has been extended to describe a struggle for human rights, political dignity and social justice. Mapfumo developed a style of music based on traditional Shona mbira music, but played with modern electric instrumentation, with lyrics characterized by social and political commentary.

References

External links
 On the Chimurenga (German)

Zimbabwean music
Political music genres
African popular music
Popular music